The Base 2 may refer to:

Base 2
The Base 2 (film)